Ivan Sarjanović (born 30 April 1949), is a Serbian physician and former professional basketball player.

Medical career 
Sarjanović earned his master's degree in medicine from the University of Belgrade in 1981. Also, he received degrees in medicine from the Marche Polytechnic University in Ancona, Italy and the University of Ljubljana, Slovenia. As a physician, Sarjanović worked in Malta, Slovenia, Italy and the United States (Houston, TX).

Also, Sarjanović was a sports physician for the Crvena zvezda basketball team and the Yugoslavia national basketball team.

Playing career 
Sarjanović spent most of his playing career with Crvena zvezda of the Yugoslav Basketball League, where he played from 1967 to 1976. At that time, his teammates were Zoran Slavnić, Dragan Kapičić, Ljubodrag Simonović, Dragiša Vučinić, Vladimir Cvetković and Goran Rakočević among others. With them he won two National Championships, three National Cups and the 1974 FIBA European Cup Winners' Cup.

After his compulsory military service in 1977, he signed for Jagodina and played four seasons there. His last game for Jagodina was against his former team Crvena zvezda at the 1981 Yugoslav Cup. Later, Sarjanović had a few stints with basketball teams located in cities where he worked as the physician.

National team career 
Sarjanović was a member of the Yugoslavia national junior team that won silver medal at the 1968 European Championship for Junior Men in Vigo, Spain. Over five tournament games, he averaged 4.8 points per game.

Career achievements 
 FIBA European Cup Winners' Cup winner: 1 (with Crvena zvezda: 1973–74).
 Yugoslav League champion: 2 (with Crvena zvezda: 1968–69, 1971–72).
 Yugoslav Cup winner: 3 (with Crvena zvezda: 1970–71, 1972–73, 1974–75).

Personal life 
Sarjanović married Ljudmila and they have two kids.

See also 
 List of KK Crvena zvezda players with 100 games played

References

1949 births
Living people
KK Crvena zvezda players
KK Jagodina players
Members of the Assembly of KK Crvena zvezda
Serbian expatriate basketball people in Italy
Serbian expatriate basketball people in Slovenia
Serbian men's basketball coaches
Serbian men's basketball players
Serbian people of Croatian descent
Serbian people of Slovenian descent
Serbian physicians
Small forwards
University of Belgrade Faculty of Medicine alumni
University of Ljubljana alumni
Yugoslav men's basketball players